Sierra Mojada is a city and seat of the municipality of Sierra Mojada, in the north-eastern Mexican state of Coahuila. Local oral tradition, documented by the priest James Lienert, states that Ambrose Bierce, who disappeared without a trace in 1913, was executed by firing squad in the town cemetery.
Silver Bull Resources (SVBL) has a silver exploration project near the town

References

Populated places in Coahuila